The 2014 Battleground was the second annual Battleground professional wrestling pay-per-view and livestreaming event produced by WWE. It took place on July 20, 2014, at the Tampa Bay Times Forum in Tampa, Florida, and was the first Battleground event to air on the WWE Network, which launched in February. It was the last WWE pay-per-view event to incorporate the WWE scratch logo, as the following month, WWE rebranded and began using the logo that was originally used for the WWE Network.

Nine matches were contested at the event, with two being shown on the Kickoff pre-show. The main event saw John Cena defeat Randy Orton, Kane, and Roman Reigns in a fatal four-way match to retain the WWE World Heavyweight Championship. The event received 99,000 buys (excluding WWE Network views), slightly down on the previous year's 114,000 buys.

Production

Background
On October 6, 2013, WWE held a new pay-per-view (PPV) event titled Battleground that replaced Over the Limit. The event was originally intended to be an annual October PPV for the promotion. The following year, a second Battleground was announced, but it was moved up to July. It was scheduled to be held on July 20, 2014, at the Tampa Bay Times Forum in Tampa, Florida. This second event in turn established Battleground as WWE's annual July PPV. In addition to PPV, this was the first Battleground to air on WWE's online streaming service, the WWE Network, which launched earlier in February.

Storylines
The card consisted of nine matches, including two on the Kickoff pre-show, that resulted from scripted storylines, where wrestlers portrayed villains, heroes, or less distinguishable characters in scripted events that built tension and culminated in a wrestling match or series of matches, with results predetermined by WWE's writers. Storylines between the characters played out on WWE's primary television programs, Raw and SmackDown.

At Money in the Bank, John Cena won a ladder match for the vacant WWE World Heavyweight Championship to become a 15-time WWE World Heavyweight Champion. The next night on Raw, Triple H scheduled Cena to defend the title at Battleground in a Fatal 4-Way match against Roman Reigns, Kane and Randy Orton.

On the June 30 episode of Raw, AJ Lee returned to WWE (her last appearance was the Raw after WrestleMania XXX) and defeated Paige for the Divas Championship for a second time. On the July 11 episode of Smackdown, AJ was scheduled to defend the title against Paige at the event.

On the June 30 edition of Raw, it was revealed that WWE Intercontinental Champion Bad News Barrett suffered an injury on the June 27 edition of SmackDown when he was thrown into the barricade by Jack Swagger. Due to this, he was stripped of the championship. Michael Cole also announced that there would be a Battleground Battle Royal at Battleground for the vacant WWE Intercontinental Championship. On the same edition, Cesaro, The Great Khali, Kofi Kingston, and Damien Sandow were added to the battle royal. On the July 1 edition of Main Event,  Dolph Ziggler, Rob Van Dam, Ryback, Curtis Axel and Big E were added to the match. On the July 4 edition of SmackDown, Alberto Del Rio and Bo Dallas were added to the match. On the July 7 edition of Raw, Fandango and Sheamus were added to the match. On the July 14 edition of Raw, Sin Cara, The Miz, Titus O'Neil, Xavier Woods, Zack Ryder, Heath Slater, R-Truth, Adam Rose and Diego were added to the match. At Battleground, it was announced that Bad News Barrett was to award the Intercontinental Championship to the winner of the battle royal.  On July 16, Sandow and Rose were pulled from the battle royal. On July 20, Sandow was reinstated into the battle royal and Fandango was pulled from the battle royal. Van Dam did not appear in the battle royal due to an injury.

On the June 30 edition of Raw, Chris Jericho returned to the WWE only for The Wyatt Family (Bray Wyatt, Luke Harper, and Erick Rowan), thus setting up a match between Wyatt and Jericho at the event.

Following Money in the Bank, WWE Tag Team Champions The Usos continued their feud with Wyatt Family members Luke Harper and Erick Rowan. On the June 30 edition of Raw, The Wyatt Family defeated The Usos and Sheamus. On the July 7 edition of Raw, Harper and Rowan defeated The Usos. On the July 11 edition of SmackDown, The Usos were scheduled to defend the title against The Wyatt Family in a 2-out-of-3 falls match at the event.

On the June 2 edition of Raw, Seth Rollins turned on The Shield by attacking both Dean Ambrose and Roman Reigns, siding with The Authority in the process. In the ensuing weeks, Rollins and Ambrose attacked each other, and each interfered in the others matches. The feud intensified when Kane assisted Rollins in winning the Money in the Bank ladder match at the Money in the Bank pay-per-view on June 29. On July 12, it was announced that Rollins and Ambrose were scheduled to face each other at Battleground.

On the June 30 edition of Raw, Jack Swagger and Zeb Colter confronted Rusev and Lana about their anti-American views. Swagger and Colter issued a challenge to Rusev, which was accepted on the July 14 edition of Raw.

Also confirmed for the event was Cameron squaring off against Naomi, which took place on the Kickoff pre-show. After they lost to AJ Lee and Paige on the July 7 edition of Raw, Cameron and Naomi attacked each other, effectively breaking up The Funkadactyls and setting up a match for the event.

On July 20, a match between Adam Rose and Fandango was scheduled for the Kickoff pre-show.

Event

Pre-Show
During the Battleground Kickoff pre-show, Adam Rose defeated Fandango, and Cameron defeated Naomi.

Preliminary matches
The actual pay-per-view opened with The Usos defending the WWE Tag Team Championship against Luke Harper and Erick Rowan of The Wyatt Family in a two out of three falls match. Harper and Rowan won the first fall after Harper executed a Big Boot on Jey. The Usos won the second fall after Jey pinned Harper with a roll-up. The Usos won the third fall after performing a double Samoan Splash on Harper, meaning The Usos retained the title.

Next, AJ Lee defended the WWE Divas Championship against Paige 
In the climax, AJ applied the black widow, which Paige countered and then performed a Paige Turner on AJ for a two count. Paige attempted the PTO, but AJ and Paige traded covers. AJ performed a Shining Wizard on Paige to retain the title.

After that, Rusev faced Jack Swagger. The ending saw Swagger apply the Patriot Lock on Rusev outside the ring but Rusev escaped the hold by pulling Swagger into the ring post and Swagger was counted out. After the match, Rusev applied The Accolade on Swagger.

Next, Dean Ambrose was scheduled to face Seth Rollins, but Ambrose was ejected from the arena by Triple H for fighting with Rollins backstage. Rollins subsequently had himself declared the winner by forfeit. Later, as Rollins was leaving the arena, he was attacked by Ambrose but managed to escape.

In the fourth match, Bray Wyatt faced Chris Jericho. During the match, Luke Harper and Erick Rowan were ejected from ringside after attempting to attack Jericho. The match ended when Jericho performed a Codebreaker on Wyatt to win the match.

In the penultimate match, the battle royal for the vacated WWE Intercontinental Championship was contested. In the end, Dolph Ziggler performed a Superkick on Sheamus to eliminate him but The Miz, who had been hiding outside the ring, eliminated Ziggler to win the title.

Main event
In the main event, John Cena defended the WWE World Heavyweight Championship against Randy Orton, Roman Reigns and Kane in a fatal four-way match. During the match, Cena applied the STF on Orton but Reigns broke the hold. Reigns performed a Spear on Cena but Kane broke the pinfall. Reigns performed a Spear on Orton through the barricade. Reigns performed a Spear on Kane but Cena broke up the pinfall. Cena performed an Attitude Adjustment on Reigns but Kane broke up the pinfall. Kane performed a Chokeslam on Cena and a Chokeslam on Reigns for a near-fall. Reigns performed a Spear on Kane but received an RKO from Orton. Cena performed an Attitude Adjustment on Orton onto Kane and pinned Kane to retain the title.

Aftermath
The Swagger-Rusev match, promoted as "United States vs. Russia", was marked in controversy after Lana made comments prior to the match blaming the United States for "recent current" world events and praising Russian president Vladimir Putin to help build heat for Rusev. Some in the media viewed the promo as a veiled reference to the crash of Malaysia Airlines Flight 17 three days earlier. In response to the backlash, a representative of WWE said that the segment "was in no way referring to the Malaysia Airlines tragedy", adding that the Rusev-Lana storyline "has been a part of WWE programming for more than three months. WWE apologizes to anyone who misunderstood last night's segment and was offended." In response to WWE's statement, Pro Wrestling Torch newsletter assistant editor James Caldwell viewed the comments as hollow, noting that reasonable viewers could conclude that Lana was referring to the plane crash. "WWE tacking on a fake apology with an insult to people's intelligence makes WWE sound even worse. All-around, it's a messy statement that conveys a lack of understanding, sensitivity, and maturity from WWE to be a decent corporate citizen", wrote Caldwell. Swagger did not appear on Raw the next night, but he had a rematch with Rusev on Main Event, which Swagger won by disqualification.

On the July 21 edition of Raw, Triple H named Brock Lesnar the number one contender for the WWE World Heavyweight Championship held by John Cena, and scheduled a title match between them at SummerSlam.

The 2014 Battleground would also be WWE's final PPV to incorporate the WWE scratch logo, as the following month, WWE rebranded and began using the logo that was originally used for the WWE Network.

Results

References

External links
Battleground Website

2014
2014 in professional wrestling in Florida
Professional wrestling shows in Tampa, Florida
2014 WWE Network events
2014 WWE pay-per-view events
July 2014 events in the United States

de:WWE#Pay-per-Views